The Korea Astronomy and Space Science Institute (KASI) is the national research institute in astronomy and space science of South Korea funded by the South Korean Government.  Its headquarters are located in Daejeon, in the Daedeok Science Town. Research at KASI covers main areas of modern astronomy, including Optical Astronomy, Radio Astronomy, Space Science, and Theoretical Astronomy.

See also 
 Bohyunsan Optical Astronomy Observatory (BOAO)
 Korean VLBI Network (KVN)
 University of Science and Technology (South Korea)

References

External links 
 KASI official website (Korean / English)
 BOAO (Korean) 
 TRAO (Korean)

Daejeon
Government agencies of South Korea
Space science organizations
Astronomy institutes and departments